Joseph Brian Scapa (born March 18, 1974) is an American politician who served in the Kansas House of Representatives as a Republican from 2011 to 2016. He was originally elected in the 87th district in 2010, facing no opposition in the primary and winning a relatively easy general election victory 65% to 35% over Democrat Om Chauhan.

In 2012, redistricting changed district lines and Scapa ran in the 88th district. He once again faced no opposition in the primary, but this time lost the general election in a narrow 53%-47% race to Patricia Sloop. In 2014, Scapa made a comeback, challenging Sloop again and winning with 50.2% of the vote. He ran for re-election in 2016, but lost to Democrat Elizabeth Bishop, in his final election as of 2023.

References

Living people
1974 births
Place of birth missing (living people)
Republican Party members of the Kansas House of Representatives
21st-century American politicians
Politicians from Wichita, Kansas